Dagda Municipality is a former municipality in Latgale, Latvia. The municipality was formed in 2009 by merging Andrupene parish, Andzeļi parish, Asūne parish, Bērziņi parish, Dagda parish, Ezernieki parish, Konstantinova parish, Ķepova parish, Svariņi parish, Šķaune parish and Dagda town the administrative centre being Dagda. As of 2020, the population was 6,549.

On 1 July 2021, Dagda Municipality ceased to exist and its territory was merged to Krāslava Municipality.

See also 
 Administrative divisions of Latvia (2009)

References 

 
Former municipalities of Latvia